John Lissauer  is an American composer, producer, and performer. At the age of 19, he arranged the first recordings of Al Jarreau. Lissauer went on to produce and arrange a pair of Leonard Cohen albums. Lissauer produced and arranged the first recording of "Hallelujah" which was featured in the film Watchmen and inducted into the Grammy Hall of Fame in 2019. He has been a composer or music producer for record albums, films, and radio and TV commercials. Lissauer received a Clio "Campaign of the Decade" award for his work for Polaroid.

Early life and education 

Lissauer was raised in Hauppauge, New York. From age 11 until he graduated from Yale College, Lissauer studied with Joseph Allard at the Juilliard School. Lissauer attended Yale University and graduated with honors in music.

Career 

Lissauer plays piano, flute, oboe, clarinet, bassoon, and saxophone. He began arranging music for Al Jarreau while still at Yale. He taught at Yale for a year, and then became a session piano player.

As a composer and music producer, he has worked with Al Jarreau, Bette Midler, Whitney Houston, and Luther Vandross.

In Canada to produce a record for Lewis Furey, Lissauer was approached by Cohen at a Furey concert. The two met again several weeks later in New York to produce the New Skin for the Old Ceremony album. John Miller, who played bass on the album, described Lissauer's approach to music as "very particular, European, simple but complex, highly imaginative". New Skin for the Old Ceremony would make the Top Thirty in the United Kingdom.

After the album was completed, Cohen appointed Lissauer as the musical director for his next two tours; Lissauer played piano, organ, saxophone, and percussion on the tours.

In 1983, Lissauer again worked with Cohen to produce the album Various Positions, including the arrangement of "Hallelujah", which would go on to become one of the most recorded songs of its time. Disappointed when Columbia Records decided against a U.S. release of the album, Lissauer decided to focus his efforts on composing for films and TV.

Although he had given up record producing, in 2006 Lissauer arranged several songs on Blue Alert by Anjani as a favor for Cohen.

In 2022, Lissauer appeared in the documentary Hallelujah: Leonard Cohen, A Journey, A Song, and composed the score.

Personal life 
Lissauer was married to Erin Dickins, with whom he restored an overgrown 35-acre property an hour north of New York City that had been owned previously by composer Frederick Loewe. In 1984, he married Lilian, with whom he had one son.

Select composer/production discography

Select filmography

Films

Threebound (Exit 74 Productions)
David & Layla (Newroz Films)
Seven (Cecchi Gori Pictures)
The Last Godfather (TLG)
Watchmen (Warner Brothers)
That Thing You Do!  (Clavius Base)
Pokémon: The First Movie  (Oriental Light and Magic)
Pokémon the Movie 2000  (4 Kids Entertainment)
Managua  (Logo Entertainment)
Apartment 1303  (Amuse)
All American Bikini Car Wash  (Meridien Films)
End Call  (MonteCristo International Entertainment)
Gods and Generals  (Turner Pictures)
So This is Christmas   (Foster Entertainment)
Fantastica  (E.I. Productions)
Dark Disciple  (Ambassador Motion Pictures)
The Rubber Gun  (St. Lawrence Film Productions)
L'Ange et la Femme  (Films RSL)
Montreal Main  (Canadian Film Development Corporation)
Beyond Paradise  (New Roz Films)
Jacob Two-Two Meets the Hooded Fang (1978 film)  (Gulkin Productions)
La Tete de Normande St. Onge  (Cinépix)
Rosewater  (Busboy Productions)
Pikachu's Vacation  (Kids' WB)
Pokémon: Mewtwo Returns  (Anime World Osaka)
Apartment 1303 3D  (1303 Productions)
Pokémon Detective Pikachu  (Warner Brothers)

Short films/documentaries

Leonard Cohen: Dance Me to the End of Love (A-Acme Film Works)
The Truce  (Independent, NYU)
Gone into the Clearing (Veech Productions)
Remember (Colassalvision)
På danske læber live (Auditorium)
Susanna  (Hidden Layers) 
Rooster  (Jamison Newlander Productions)
Mickey Lee  (Lawnrunner Films)
Crackshot Stu  (Lawnrunner Films)
Clever Grete  (Tabularassa Productions)
 Hallelujah: Leonard Cohen, A Journey, A Song (Sony)

Television

Pokémon  (TV Series) (Pokémon USA)
Supernova (Hallmark Entertainment)
Flood: A River’s Rampage (Hallmark Entertainment)
An American Girl on the Home Front (American Girl)
No Big Deal (Cinétudes Films)
Shinchan  (JPS Producties; Shin Ei Animation; TV Asahi)

Self

Marianne & Leonard: Words of Love  (Sundance) 
Leonard Cohen: Under Review 1934–1977 (Chrome Dreams Media)
Hallelujah: It Goes Like This (Geller/Goldfine Productions)
 Hallelujah: Leonard Cohen, A Journey, A Song (Sony)

Notes

References

External links

Official website

Living people
People from Hauppauge, New York
Juilliard School alumni
Yale University alumni
Year of birth missing (living people)
Musicians from New Jersey
Musicians from New York (state)
People from Summit, New Jersey